Trouble Boys may refer to:

Trouble Boys, 2013 album by Swedish dansband Lasse Stefanz
"Trouble Boys", a song written by Billy Bremner using the pseudonym of Billy Murray, first recorded by Dave Edmunds.